The Battle of Delhi was fought between Khalsa Sikhs and the Mughal Empire in 1783.

Background and battle
The Sikhs under Baghel Singh, leader of the Karorsinghia Misl, began raiding and plundering the outskirts of Delhi in 1764. In April 1782, Najaf Khan hitherto the highest commander of the Mughal army died, after which a power struggle ensued allowing the Sikhs to capture Delhi. The Sikhs reappeared in Delhi and plundered its environs and laid waste the country up to Khujra. Some of the Sikhs having ravaged the Gangetic Doab contemplated approaching Ruhilkhand, though they were deterred by the arrival of the Nawab of Oudh's forces as well as some English battalions to the area, forcing them to concentrate solely on the Doab. Some of the rajas reigning over areas dominated by the Sikhs agreed to pay tribute to them. The main body of the Sikhs having plundered Aligarh and Buland Shahar proceeded towards Delhi where they further set Malka Ganj and Sabzi Mandi on fire. They managed to capture the Red Fort on 11 March after defeating a defence by Prince Mirza Shikoh. Thereafter, a settlement was agreed upon between the Sikhs and the Delhi court which entailed a cash present of three lakh rupees and Baghel Singh staying behind at the head of 4000 Sikh troops to oversee the construction of gurdwaras in the city. The main body of Sikhs left Delhi on 12 March 1783 following the settlement.

Dispute over throne 
Jassa Singh Ahluwalia was placed on the throne of Delhi as Badshah Singh of Delhi but Ramgarhia objected that no one can sit on the throne without the approval of Sarbat Khalsa.

Aftermath

Sardar Jassa Singh Ramgarhia captured the Red Fort of Delhi in conjunction with Sardar Baghel Singh. He detached the throne of Mughal emperor Aurangzeb (on which he ordered the death of 9th guru Guru Teg Bahadur ji) and brought it on elephants and kept it at Golden Temple, Amritsar. Even today it is present at the Golden Temple known as Ramgarhia Bunga.

See also
 Sikh raids on Delhi

Photo gallery
Mughal slab from Delhi was roped with horse and brought to Amritsar in Punjab.

References

Sources

External links
 News article on Baghel Singh 

Delhi
Conflicts in 1783
1783 in India
Delhi